The Twentieth Street Historic District in Los Angeles, California, consists of a row of bungalow and Craftsman style houses in the 900 block on the south side of 20th Street, within the West Adams neighborhood.

The homes were built by W.Wayman Watts and built in the early part of the 20th century.  The district was added to the National Register of Historic Places in 1991.

It includes:
the James Marsh House (1904), 916 West 20th Street, a two-story Craftsman house, probably built by W.W. Watts
the Arthur C. Thorpe House (1905), 920 West 20th Street, a two-story Chalet Style Craftsman house, built by W.W. Watts

See also
 List of Registered Historic Places in Los Angeles

References

Further reading

  Diane Wedner, "Neighborly Advice: Western Heights: Taking Over From Titans," Los Angeles Times,  September 16, 2007, page K-4
  Carol Mithers, "Vanishing: The History of One House in Los Angeles," Los Angeles Times Magazine, April 17, 2005, page 16
  Scott Harris, "Days Are Numbered for Historic Mansion That Sparked Racial Politics," Los Angeles Times, April 11, 1991, page VYB-1
  Sandy Banks, "The 'Battle' of West Adams: Restorationists Buying Homes in Largely Black L.A. Neighborhood and Hostility to Them Has Risen," Los Angeles Times, December 1, 1985, page 1

Historic districts in Los Angeles
National Register of Historic Places in Los Angeles
West Adams, Los Angeles
Historic districts on the National Register of Historic Places in California